Tomb KV17, located in Egypt's Valley of the Kings and also known by the names "Belzoni's tomb", "the Tomb of Apis", and "the Tomb of Psammis, son of Nechois", is the tomb of Pharaoh Seti I of the Nineteenth Dynasty. It is one of the most decorated tombs in the valley, and is one of the largest and deepest tombs in the Valley of the Kings. It was uncovered by Italian archaeologist and explorer Giovanni Battista Belzoni on 16 October, 1817.

Design 
Previously considered the longest tomb in the valley until the discovery of the Tomb of the Sons of Ramesses II, at 137.19 meters (450.10 feet), it contains well preserved reliefs in all but two of its eleven chambers and side rooms. A portion of the tomb is still being excavated, known as Corridor K. Corridor K leads away, into the mountainside, from beneath the location where the sarcophagus stood in the burial chamber. The tunnel has not been properly excavated, as much of the tunnel has been filled with debris. Probing projects into the tunnel started around 2001;  according to the Theban Mapping Project, "A project to geophysically explore the corridor was approved by the Supreme Council of Antiquities". No results have been made public from this excavation, as of March 12th, 2023. 

The design of the tomb follows a "joggled axis" style of architecture; the tomb entry's descending line is interrupted by a "wiggle" that changes to a sharper angle of descent when entering the tomb following the first chamber. The entry to the tomb consists of four hallways (A–D), each leading further underground; they have a number of murals depicting traditional religious imagery along with illustrations of Seti I before Ra. Deeper into the tomb, rooms F, Fa, J, Jb, Jc and Jd have intricately carved support pillars with well preserved decorations. It is also one of the first discovered tombs to have a vaulted burial chamber, along with remaining examples of construction, such as plastered over postholes where wooden beams would have been. 

A shaft was cut into the floor of chamber E, its purpose unknown. 

Parts of the tomb ceilings have been painted with gold stars on a deep blue sky, a common motif in temples and tombs in Egypt. Numerous rooms in Seti's tomb use the motif, including rooms such as side chamber Jb with the Imydwat. There are many richly decorated rooms, with their own general themes.

The body identified as Seti's mummy was not found in his coffin upon Belzoni's discovery of the tomb, but rather in the royal cache DB320 amongst 36 other mummies. His coffin (perhaps the inner or secondary coffin) was heavily damaged, as was his mummy. It has been postulated that priests of numerous dynasties attempted restorations of both his tomb and his coffin, but his mummy was finally moved in the Year 11 of Shoshenq I to cache DB320. The outer coffin was going to be sold by Belzoni to the British Museum in 1817, but it was sold for $2000 USD to a British architect later that year, which now rests in the Sir John Soan's Museum London.

Decoration 
The entry corridors (Corridors B–D) are heavily decorated with symbols of the Pharaoh, like those of Ma'at and a list of Set's royal names and epithets. One of the back chambers is decorated with the Opening of the mouth ceremony, which shows the Egyptian belief that a magic religious ceremony would open the lungs and throat of the mummy, allowing them to breathe in the afterlife. Considered a very important religious ceremony, a semi-complete depiction of this ritual provides an in-depth view of the pantheon of practices undertaken to ensure safe passage into the afterlife. Further into the tomb are numerous depictions of King Seti with numerous Gods. Chamber F depicts images of Seti with Hathor, Horus and Neith, along with intact mural examples of the Book of Gates.The tomb is covered floor to ceiling by detailed murals and reliefs. The ceiling of the vaulted burial chamber depicts a series of astronomical motifs, with golden stars on a deep blue background. Other decorations are religious in nature, including depictions of the Litan of Ra, the Book of The Dead, the Imydwat, the Book of The Heavenly Cow and depictions of Seti with various deities. There are also depictions of the King alone, standing in the pillars of the room. Each room is heavily decorated, both wall and ceiling, along with numerous columns and floor skirting. Much of the floor skirting is damaged, due to both the ravages of time and the damage due to excavation.

Archaeology and conservation 
The tomb was uncovered by Italian explorer and Early Egyptologist Giovanni Battista Belzoni on 16 October 1817. Upon entering the tomb, Belzoni found the wall paintings in excellent condition with the paint on the walls still looking fresh, and some of the artists' paints and brushes still on the floor. The tomb became known as the "Apis tomb" upon the discovery of a mummified Apis Bull found in a side room off the burial hall when Belzoni uncovered the tomb.

Much of the structural damage to the tomb before the 1950's and 1960's was caused by Belzoni. Belzoni, in an effort to bring back pieces of Egyptian art, damaged much of the work within the tomb. He made "squeezes", a form of copying artwork by pressing wet wax, plaster and sometimes paper against the reliefs; when they dried, the color was pulled away, and a negative impression was made of the carvings, but it also damaged many of the reliefs and carvings. Beyond the use of "squeezes", Belzoni also hacked off large pieces of relief to send back to Europe, along with clearing rubble that held back flash floodwaters; the tomb subsequently flooded, damaging large portions of the structure and damaged the reliefs in the entryway.

The outer layer of the sarcophagus of Seti I, removed on behalf of the British consul Henry Salt, is located in the Sir John Soane's Museum in London since 1824. Jean-François Champollion, translator of the Rosetta Stone, removed a wall panel of 2.26 x 1.05 m (7.41 x 3.44 ft) in a corridor with mirror-image scenes during his 1828–29 expedition. Other elements were removed by his companion Rossellini or by Karl Richard Lepsius in the German expedition of 1845. The scenes are now in the collections of the Louvre in Paris, the Egyptian Museum in Florence, and the Neues Museum in Berlin.

A number of walls in the tomb have collapsed or cracked due to excavations in the late 1950s and early 1960s causing significant changes in the moisture levels in the surrounding rocks.

There have been a number of recent 21st century attempts at preservation, both through image-mapping projects like the Theban Mapping Project and the Maidan Project, and through intense laser scanning of the reliefs on the walls of the tomb by the Factum Foundation leading to much of the images within the tomb available to the public. A 3-D scan of the temple was made available in 2002, allowing viewers to 'walk' through the tomb through a series of 3d photos. Restoration has been a nearly constant effort, as the tomb remains closed due to damage.

Facsimiles of two rooms from the tomb, the Hall of Beauties and Pillared Hall J, were made by the Factum Foundation for Digital Technology in Conservation in 2017.

Tourism 
Due to excavation and the damages of improperly regulated tourism, visitations may or may not be possible, as archaeology efforts in the 1950's and 1960's have made parts of the tomb unstable. However, as of 2023, the Tomb is open for visitations. The price of entry into the tomb, as stated by the Ministry of Tourism and Antiquities, is EGP 1000 for adult foreigners and students, but for Egyptians the ticket price is  EGP 500 for adults and EGP 250 for students.

Gallery

References

 Reeves, N. & Wilkinson, R. H. The Complete Valley of the Kings, 1996, Thames and Hudson, London.
 Siliotti, A., Guide to the Valley of the Kings and to the Theban Necropolises and Temples 1996, A.A. Gaddis, Cairo.
 Belzoni, Giovanni, Narratives of the operations and recent discoveries in Egypt and Nubia:... 1820

External links

 Theban Mapping Project: KV17 includes description, images, and plans of the tomb.
 360° Photosphere virtual visit of Seti I Tomb in the Kings' Valley

1817 archaeological discoveries
Buildings and structures completed in the 13th century BC
Valley of the Kings
Seti I